Chris Knox (born 2 September 1952) is a New Zealand rock and roll musician, cartoonist and movie reviewer who emerged during the punk rock era with his bands The Enemy and Toy Love. After Toy Love disbanded in the early 1980s, he formed the group Tall Dwarfs with guitarist Alec Bathgate. The Tall Dwarfs were noted for their unpolished sound and intense live shows. His 4-track machine was used to record most of the early Flying Nun singles.

He has also released a number of solo, self-produced albums which feature his Casiotone. Knox has also released an album under the pseudonym 'Friend'.

Career
At the 2001 New Zealand Music Awards Knox's ballad "Not Given Lightly" (1990) was announced as New Zealand's thirteenth best song of all time, as voted by APRA members. A love song written for "John and Liesha's mother"—his then-partner Barbara—this track never scaled commercial heights though it has belatedly generated some income for the songwriter through its use in TV advertising (notably for Vogel's bread).

Knox has played live in front of audiences all around New Zealand, winning a reputation for his sometimes confrontational style, and performed annually at Wellington's Bar Bodega. He has also extensively toured internationally. His swing through the US in 1995 included, among others, stops in Seattle to play the Crocodile Cafe. His minimalist, DIY sound played well to ears then-focused on grunge, with its retro-punk stylings.

A long-time resident of Auckland, Knox spent time as a newspaper columnist and film reviewer for Real Groove. In 1986-1987, he edited and published three issues of a New Zealand comics anthology Jesus on a Stick. Starting in 1987, his satirical comic strip Max Media appeared in The New Zealand Herald every week until 2009. He has also been an occasional television film reviewer, hosted a Television New Zealand season of classic movies, and presented two seasons of arts series New Artland.

Knox launched his own label 'A Major Records' in 2006 to release the album Chris Knox and the Nothing. This was the first album Knox recorded in a professional studio, rather than in his trademark DIY style, since his time with Toy Love.

Knox's "It's Love", from the 2000 album Beat, has been used in "Share the Good", a Heineken Premium Light commercial directed by Todd Haynes and cinematographed by Edward Lachman.

In 2009 Knox was awarded a New Zealand Arts Foundation Arts Laureate Award.

On 11 June 2009 Knox was admitted to Auckland hospital suffering from a stroke. The album Stroke: Songs for Chris Knox was released in New Zealand on 16 November 2009. It features 33 artists performing Knox's songs. The album is a way for Knox's fans to contribute to the costs of his rehabilitation. All artists contributed their time and talent without charge. Artists include Jay Reatard, David Kilgour, The Mint Chicks, Shayne Carter, Yo La Tengo, Bonnie 'Prince' Billy, Bill Callahan, The Mountain Goats, The Bats, The Chills, The Verlaines, Jeff Mangum, The Nothing (including Chris), Tall Dwarfs and Lou Barlow.

The Greenwich Village arts venue Le Poisson Rouge hosted a benefit concert for Knox on 6 May 2010. Artists included Jeff Mangum and Yo La Tengo, who both participated in the 2009 benefit album for Knox.

Since his stroke, Knox has done a very small number of live appearances, for instance at the presentation of Stroke – Songs For Chris Knox in November 2009, on 22 April 2012, on 29 September 2012 in Auckland, with Rackets, as Knoxious and in support of Neutral Milk Hotel on 23 and 24 of November, 2013.

Discography

LPs

Compilations

Tribute albums

Singles and EPs

See also

:Category:Albums produced by Chris Knox

Awards

Aotearoa Music Awards
The Aotearoa Music Awards (previously known as New Zealand Music Awards (NZMA)) are an annual awards night celebrating excellence in New Zealand music and have been presented annually since 1965.

! 
|-
| 1993 || Chris Knox for Duck Shaped Pain and Gum || Album Cover of the Year||  ||rowspan="4"| 
|-
| 1994 || Chris Knox for 3 EPs by Tall Dwarfs || Album Cover of the Year||  
|-
| 1995 || Chris Knox for Songs of You and Me || Album Cover of the Year||  
|-
| 2006 || Chris Knox for As Sweet As Sin (Bleeders) || Album Cover of the Year||  
|-
| 2012 || Chris Knox (as part of Toy Love) || New Zealand Music Hall of Fame ||  || 
|-

References

External links
NZ Listener Interview with Chris Knox
Audio Culture Profile on Chris Knox including artwork and video collection
Chris Knox + 0 – official MySpace site
NZOnScreen collection of Chris Knox's music videos
NZOnScreen biography
Interview with Knox by Roger Shepherd Part 1 and Part 2
Chris Knox master tape archive at the Alexander Turnbull Library

1952 births
APRA Award winners
New Zealand cartoonists
New Zealand male guitarists
New Zealand male singer-songwriters
20th-century New Zealand male singers
20th-century New Zealand male artists
21st-century New Zealand male singers
21st-century New Zealand male artists
Flying Nun Records artists
Dunedin Sound musicians
Living people
People from Invercargill